The Independent Politics Netherlands (OPNL) formerly known as the Independent Senate Group (Onafhankelijke Senaatsfractie) is a political party in the Dutch Senate with one senator, representing several provincial parties. OPNL differs from other Dutch political parties in that it does not allow for individual membership, but only grants membership to provincial parties, or municipal local parties that are members of a provincial party. The OPNL only contests the elections for the Eerste Kamer and represents regionalist interests.

History 
In 1995, several provincial parties and The Greens proposed their own independent list for the Senate elections, called the Platform of Independent Groups/Greens (Platform van Onafhankelijke Groepen/De Groenen). Marten Bierman (a member of The Greens) was elected through preferential vote. In 1999 Bierman was reelected.

In 2003, Henk ten Hoeve became senator for the OSF. He was a member of the Friesland states-provincial representing the Frisian National Party. He remained senator until 2011. Ten Hoeve was succeeded by Kees de Lange. De Lange was elected on the OSF list, but was a member of the 50PLUS party, with which the OSF had a vote sharing agreement, as the OSF did not achieve enough votes to get a seat independently. In 2015 De Lange broke with the OSF due to a disagreement concerning the possible cooperation between the OSF and the People's Party of Limburg of Jos van Rey, a former VVD alderman and representative plagued by corruption scandals.

In 2015, Henk ten Hoeve became senator of the OSF for a second time. Between 2019 and 2021 Gerben Gerbrandy, former mayor of Achtkarspelen, has been the senator representing the OSF. Gerbrandy left the Senate in January 2021 and was replaced by Ton Raven, a former alderman from Sittard-Geleen.

Name change 
In 2021, the party's name was changed to Independent Politics Netherlands.

Members
OPNL consists of the following provincial parties:

Eerste Kamer Election results

References

External links
Official website

Regionalist parties in the Netherlands
Political parties established in 1999
1999 establishments in the Netherlands